Employees' Provident Fund (EPF; Malay: Kumpulan Wang Simpanan Pekerja, KWSP) is a federal statutory body under the purview of the Ministry of Finance. It manages the compulsory savings plan and retirement planning for private sector workers in Malaysia. Membership of the EPF is mandatory for Malaysian citizens employed in the private sector, and voluntary for non-Malaysian citizens.

History 
Malaysian EPF was established in 1951 pursuant to the Employees Provident Fund Ordinance 1951, under the National Director of Posts. This law became the EPF Act 1951. In 1982, then the EPF Act 1991 in 1991. The EPF Act 1991 requires employees and their employers to contribute towards their retirement savings, and allows workers to withdraw these savings at retirement or for special purposes before then. As of 31 December 2012, EPF has 13.6 million members, of which 6.4 million are active contributing members. At the same date, EPF had 502,863 contributing employers.

The EPF is intended to help employees from the private sector save a fraction of their salary in a lifetime banking scheme, to be used primarily as a retirement fund but also in the event that the employee is temporarily or no longer fit to work. The EPF also provides a framework for employers to meet legal and moral obligations to their employees.

As of 31 December 2020, the size of the EPF asset size stood at RM998 billion. (US$238 billion), making it the fourth largest pension fund in Asia and seventh largest in the world.

As of 2012, the EPF functions by requiring a contribution of at least 11% of each member's monthly salary and storing it in a savings account, while the member's employer is obligated to additionally fund at least 12% of employee's salary to the savings at the same time (13% if salary is below RM5,000).

While in savings, a member's EPF savings may be used as investments for companies deemed profitable and permissible by the organisation, from which dividends are banked to respective members' accounts. Alternately, members may use their EPF savings in their own investments, although such activities are not covered by the EFP and the members are to bear any losses made.

Dividends 
The EPF declares an annual dividend on funds on deposit which has varied over time, depending on investment results.

Legally, the EPF is only obligated to provide 2.5% dividends (as per Section 27 of the Employees Provident Fund Act 1991).

The EPF claims that the lowered dividend is the result of its decision to invest in low-risk fixed revenue instruments, which produce lower returns but maintains the principal value of its members' contributions. This is due to the EPF primarily aimed at providing a stable financial security of its members.

In addition, the EPF further elaborates dividend rates and their performances are calculated and influenced based on the full distribution of net EPF revenue, depending on the return on investments that in turn is based on asset allocation.

The EPF also attributes the declining interest market rate since 1996 to the interest market rate. Because 75% of investment funds are concentrated towards bodies closely linked to trends in the interest market rate, including Malaysian Government Securities, loans or bonds, and money market instruments, low interest rates for the past few years had an adverse effect on returns for EPF investments.

In April 2007, criticism was raised at a proposed amendment of EPF guidelines (the EPF Bill (Amendment) 2007) that cuts monthly contributions of members above 55 years by 50% (6.2% from 11% for employees, and 5.7% from 12% for employers). The change was described as a disadvantage to tens and thousands of members compared to those under the pension scheme as the former is not given free medical treatment after retirement, and was described as a form of discrimination towards senior members. Under the proposal, an employer of foreign workers may also optionally contribute RM5 monthly per head, raising concerns of employers' preferences towards foreign employees. The government responded by claiming that the proposal may be studied, and later states that members can contribute at any amount above the slashed contributed amount. The EPF guideline for employers of foreign workers remains unchanged, citing that the policy has been implemented before in 1998.

Conventional Savings (1952–2000)

Conventional Savings (2000–present)

Simpanan Shariah (2018–present) 
The Simpanan Shariah is a savings option managed and invested by the EPF in accordance with Shariah principles. To ensure that the Simpanan Shariah is managed in accordance with Shariah as required under section 43A of the EPF Act, a Shariah governance framework is established to govern the Shariah compliance aspects of the EPF Simpanan Shariah.

Withdrawal 
As a retirement plan, money accumulated in an EPF savings can only be withdrawn when members reach 50 years old, during which they may withdraw only 30% of their EPF; members who are 55 years old or older may withdraw all of their EPF. When a member dies beforehand, the EPF fund is withdrawn in favour of a nominated individual. Withdrawals are also possible when a member permanently emigrates, becomes disabled, or requires essential medical treatment. Members above 55 years old can choose not to withdraw EPF savings immediately and withdraw only later, and, under existing guidelines, employers may continue to contribute 12% of the members' salaries at their own discretion.

Accounts 
Effective 1 January 2007, a member's EPF savings consists of two accounts that vary by their share of savings and withdrawal flexibilities. The first account, dubbed "Account I", stores 70% of the members' monthly contribution, while the second account, dubbed "Account II", stores 30%. Account I restricts withdrawals to the moment the member reaches an age of 50 years, to boost retirement fund by investment in unit trust, is incapacitated, leaves the country or passes away. Withdrawal of savings from Account II however, is permitted for down payments or loan settlements for a member's first house, finances for education and medical expenses, investments, and the time when the member reaches 55 years of age.

Development of Bukit Bintang City Centre 
A joint venture development between EPF, UDA Holdings and Eco World Development Group Berhad was announced in 2016 to develop the Bukit Bintang City Centre (BBCC), a fully integrated development located on the former site of Pudu Prison, with the project 40% owned by UDA, 40% owned by EcoWorld and 20% owned by EPF.

See also
 The Central Provident Fund, Singapore's Provident Fund
 Provident Fund, for other "Provident Funds" in other countries.
 Economy of Malaysia

References

 Alaudin, R. I., Ismail, N., & Isa, Z. (2017). Determinants of retirement wealth adequacy: A case study in Malaysia. Institutions and Economies, 9(1), 81–98. Access to Document Link to publication in Scopus Link to citation list in Scopus

External links
 
 Employees Provident Fund at the official Malaysian government website.

 
Government-owned companies of Malaysia
Age pension systems
Social security in Malaysia
Investment in Malaysia
1991 establishments in Malaysia
Ministry of Finance (Malaysia)
Minister of Finance (Incorporated) (Malaysia)
Privately held companies of Malaysia